The Combines Investigation Act was a Canadian Act of Parliament, implemented in 1910, passed in 1923 by MacKenzie King, which regulated certain corporate business practices that were anti-competitive. It prohibited monopolies, misleading advertising, bid-rigging, price fixing, and other means of limiting competition.  It was revised in 1952 and amended in 1969 by the Criminal Law Amendment Act, 1968–69. It was a rather notorious piece of legislation in Canadian constitutional law for the powers it granted to non-police officers to enter private premises without a judicially issued search warrant and seize evidence that they suspected were in relation to a violation of the Act. This culminated in a raid of the offices of the Edmonton Journal and the ensuing Supreme Court decision in Hunter v Southam Inc, where provisions of the Act were held to be inoperative in light of the recently enacted Canadian Charter of Rights and Freedoms''' section 8 protection against unreasonable search and seizure. The Act was repealed in July 1986 and replaced with the Competition Act.

Film

John P. Rocca, the president of Rocca Cinemas Limited, filed a complaint of unjust discrimination with the Nova Scotia Amusements Regulation Board against Bellevue Film Distributors, Astral Films Limited, Paramount Pictures, United Artists, Warner Bros., Universal Pictures, and 20th Century Fox on 24 February 1975. He claimed that they violated the Nova Scotia Theatre and Amusements Act by not giving his theatre first-run films. When he opened his theatre its first showing was a first time run of Benji, but he was unable to gain other first-run films. The board stated its investigation on May 13, under the leadership of R.B. Kimball and ruled against Rocca after almost three years of investigations. Kimball stated that Rocca could show how historical patterns resulted in allocations that favored Odeon and Famous Players, but not that distributors were legally required to give their first-run films to them.Jack and the Beanstalk was released in Canada by Columbia Pictures in 1976, and was played in Toronto in the Bijou Theatre and Odeon theatres as a first-run film. The Bijou Theatre lowered its adult ticket price from $3.25 to $1 causing Odeon to file a complaint to Columbia. The Bijou Theatre increased it prices after Columbia threatened to not give it first-run films in the future. A letter sent by Harvey Harnick, Columbia's general manager, to I. Levitt, Columbia's assistant general manager, discussing the event was seized by C.G. McMullen, an investigator for the Department of Consumer and Corporate Affairs. Columbia was charged with violating the Combines Investigation Act and the company pled guilty on 9 June 1977, and was given a $1,250 fine and an order to not repeat the offense. The crown attorney appealed the decision stating that the provincial court judge did not give sufficient consideration to the aspect of deterrence and the Court of Appeal for Ontario increased the fine to $5,000. This was the first time that an American company was convicted for using monopolistic power to limit competition in Canada.

United Artists was charge with violating the Combines Investigation Act of prohibiting Famous Players from lowering the price of admission for One Flew Over the Cuckoo's Nest, The Missouri Breaks, and A Bridge Too Far'' although United Artists claimed that Famous Players misunderstood their demand of not accepting free admission. An order by the Federal Court of Canada prohibited United Artists from price fixing.

Bellevue, an American company which handled the distribution of Walt Disney films in Canada, ordered that theatres charge a minimum admission of $0,25 for all children under twelve as they were getting in for free prior to this. On 19 May 1979, a prohibition order was made against Bellevue for price fixing.

References

Works cited
 

1923 in Canadian law
Canadian federal legislation
Repealed Canadian legislation
History of competition law